Harry Falk may refer to:
 Harry Falk (Indologist)
 Harry Falk (director)